Lorándite is a thallium arsenic sulfosalt with the chemical formula: TlAsS2. Though rare, it is the most common thallium-bearing mineral. Lorandite occurs in low-temperature hydrothermal associations and in gold and mercury ore deposits. Associated minerals include stibnite, realgar, orpiment, cinnabar, vrbaite, greigite, marcasite, pyrite, tetrahedrite, antimonian sphalerite, arsenic and barite.

The mineral is being used for detection of solar neutrino via a certain nuclear reaction involving thallium. It has a monoclinic crystal structure consisting of spiral chains of AsS3 tetrahedra interconnected by thallium atoms, and can be synthesized in the laboratory.

History
Lorándite was first discovered at the Allchar deposit, near Kavadarci (now North Macedonia) in 1894 and named after Loránd Eötvös, a prominent Hungarian physicist.

Distribution
Apart from the Allchar deposit in North Macedonia, lorandite is also found at the Dzhizhikrut Sb–Hg deposit in Tajikistan and at the Beshtau uranium deposit, near Pyatigorsk, northern Caucasus Mountains, Russia. As an ore mineral, it is encountered at the Lanmuchang Hg–Tl deposit, Guizhou Province, China; at the Zarshuran gold deposit in northeastern Iran; and at the Lengenbach Quarry in Switzerland. In the US, it is present at the New Rambler Cu–Ni mine in Wyoming; at the Jerritt Canyon mines, Independence Mountains district and Carlin Gold mine in Nevada; and at the Mercur gold deposit in Utah.

Laboratory synthesis
Single crystals of lorandite can be grown from a mixture of thallium(I) nitrate (TlNO3), elemental arsenic and sulfur in concentrated aqueous solution of ammonia. The mixture is placed in an autoclave and is kept at elevated temperature (~250 °C) for several days. This procedure yields deep-red prismatic crystals elongated along the [001] crystal axis, which are similar to the mineral　in appearance and crystallographic structure details.

Structure

The crystal structure of lorandite is monoclinic, space group P21/a, Z = 4, with the lattice constants a = 1.228 nm, b = 1.130 nm, c = 0.6101 nm and β = 104.5 °. It consists of spiral chains of AsS3 tetrahedra oriented to the [010] crystal axis. The chains are covalently interlinked by irregularly coordinated Tl atoms (chain interconnections not shown in the picture), and breaking of these links is responsible for crystal cleavage.

Occurrence
The tectonic setting of the Allchar deposit, North Macedonia where lorandite was originally discovered, is an anticline structure originating from sediments of the upper Cretaceous Period. During the mineralization processes, the presence of andesite rocks caused movements of hydrothermal solutions along the dolomite and andesite contacts enabling the formation of lorandite deposits.

Applications
In 1976, it was proposed to use a thallium-rich mineral, lorándite, for detection of solar neutrino. The method relies on the 205Tl(νe,e−)205Pb reaction, which has a relatively low threshold energy of 52 keV and thus relatively high efficiency. This reaction yields 205Pb isotope which has a long lifetime of 15.4 million years; it is induced not only by neutrinos, but also by other cosmic particles. They all have different penetration depths in the Earth's crust, and thus analysis of the 205Pb content in a thallium-containing ore taken from different depths brings information on the neutrinos of the past millennia. Thus, the LORandite EXperiment (LOREX), is running between 2008 and 2010 and is based in one of the largest source of lorandite, the Allchar deposit in southern North Macedonia.

See also 

 Hutchinsonite

References

External links
Spectroscopic data for lorandite

Thallium minerals
Arsenic minerals
Sulfosalt minerals
Monoclinic minerals
Minerals in space group 14